Daniel Walton is a former professional rugby league footballer and powerlifter. He played rugby league in the late 2000s and early 2010s for York City Knights and Coventry Bears. He competed in powerlifting in the late 2010’s.

Rugby League Career

York City Knights
Walton was named academy player of the year in 2008. He made his first team debut the following season against Hunslet Hawks. Walton signed a one-year contract extension with the club for the 2010 season.

Coventry Bears
Walton signed for the Coventry Bears midway through the 2011 season but was unable to help them secure a play-off spot.

Powerlifting
Walton competed in the 105 kg weight class at the 2018 All England Powerlifting Championships after achieving qualification the previous year. He won the Yorkshire and North East seniors title in 2019 for the 120 kg class.

References 

Living people
Coventry Bears players
English rugby league players
English weightlifters
Year of birth missing (living people)
York City Knights players